Tocană, also known as tocăniță, is a Romanian stew prepared with tomato, garlic and sweet paprika. Traditionally, it is consumed with a cornmeal mush named mămăligă. The dish has a history of being consumed by shepherds in the Romanian mountains. Derived from the Latin "toccare" into the modern "toca", the term is sometimes rendered as "tokana" in English.

Variations
Variations include the inclusion of mushrooms in the stew's preparation. Additional variations include the addition or use of meat, such as lamb, and potatoes.

See also

 List of stews
 Tochitură
 Tokány

References

External links
 Tokana (Shepherd's stew). Cookipedia.co.uk.
 Moldavian Mushroom Stew (Tokana). AZCookbook.com.

Romanian stews